The 2021–22 season is Colchester United's 85th season in their history and their sixth successive season competing in League Two. Along with competing in League Two, the club also participated in the FA Cup, EFL Cup and EFL Trophy.

Season overview

Pre-season
Colchester's place in League Two for the 2021–22 season was confirmed on 1 May 2021 in their penultimate game of the season following a 1–0 win against Salford City.

On 13 May, following the close of the 2020–21 season having led the U's to safety, Mullins was named permanent head coach of Colchester United.

The club announced the retained list for the 2021–22 season on 14 May. Harry Beadle, Ryan Clampin, Sam Cornish, Billy Cracknell and Tom Eastman were offered new contracts, with Ben Stevenson and Michael Folivi awaiting contract decisions or discussions.

Players released at the end of their contracts included Joshua Bohui, 2020–21 top scorer Jevani Brown, Callum Coulter, Paris Cowan-Hall, Luke Gambin, Callum Harriott, Tom Lapslie, club captain Harry Pell, Courtney Senior, Omar Sowunmi and Diaz Wright.

On 25 May, long-serving defender Tom Eastman signed a new two-year contract with the club. Colchester also announced their first signing of the season with Cole Skuse joining from Ipswich Town on a two-year deal following his release from the Suffolk club.

On 4 June, young defenders Harry Beadle and Billy Cracknell signed one-year contracts with the club. Beadle joined up with the U's towards the end of the 2020–21 season with his contract at Charlton Athletic expiring, while Cracknell, who made his first-team debut last season, also agreed his first professional deal.

On 7 June, midfielder Sam Cornish joined Beadle and Cracknell in signing his first professional contract with the club, agreeing a one-year contract.

The same day, fellow midfielder Ben Stevenson revealed he would be leaving the club after two-and-a-half years with the U's.

Colchester announced the signing of both centre back Luke Chambers from Ipswich Town and midfielder Luke Hannant from Cambridge United on two-year deals on 10 June.

Left-back Ryan Clampin agreed a new two-year contract with the club on 11 June.

On 15 June, Colchester announced the re-signing of Freddie Sears on a two-year contract from Ipswich Town following his release. The club also revealed a new assistant manager, with Alex Dyer joining Hayden Mullins' team.

Colchester re-signed Frank Nouble for a third time on 18 June when he joined on a free transfer from Plymouth Argyle on a two-year deal. Joining alongside Nouble was Alan Judge who became the fourth player to sign for Colchester directly from Ipswich Town following his release.

Wales under-21 defender Cameron Coxe joined Colchester on loan from National League side Solihull Moors on 2 July. He signed initially until January 2022.

On 5 July, Brendan Sarpong-Wiredu and Tommy Smith both extended their contracts with the club by a further year, with both now set to expire in summer 2023. Junior Tchamadeu also signed a new deal by committing for three years until 2024.

Colchester played their first pre-season friendly on 13 July at Billericay Town. Second-half goals from Alan Judge, trialist Richard Kone, and Freddie Sears earned the U's a 3–0 victory.

Tommy Smith was announced as Colchester's new captain ahead of the new season following the departure of Harry Pell.

Colchester played two 60-minute matches against Watford on 17 July fielding entirely different teams in each. The Premier League club won the first match 2–1 with Alan Judge scoring the U's goal, and then won 2–0 in the second.

Colchester welcomed Tottenham Hotspur to the Colchester Community Stadium for a friendly on 21 July. Three first-half goals from Son Heung-min, Lucas Moura and Dele Alli were enough to give the Premier League side victory as fans returned to the stadium for the first time in seven months.

Gillingham were the visitors for the next home friendly on 24 July, but the U's suffered a 2–0 defeat to their League One opponents.

On 27 July, Colchester played out an entertaining 3–3 draw with local rivals Ipswich Town at the Community Stadium. Town took an early lead through Joe Pigott before former Ipswich man Tommy Smith headed the U's level. Former Colchester player Macauley Bonne scored for Ipswich to make it 2–1 but a header from another former Ipswich player Frank Nouble ensured the sides were level at the break. Summer signing Alan Judge put the hosts 3–2 up against his former club, but a late equaliser from Wes Burns ensured the game finished a draw.

The U's played their final friendly game of pre-season on 31 July as they hosted Wealdstone. Noah Chilvers scored for Colchester, but a late penalty scored by Josh Umerah meant the match ended 1–1.

August
On 2 August, Peterborough United signed midfielder Kwame Poku from Colchester for a "substantial six-figure fee" on a four-year contract.

On 4 August, Colchester confirmed the signing of Fulham forward Sylvester Jasper on loan until January 2022.

Ahead of their season opening game at Carlisle United on 7 August, Colchester signed Newcastle United goalkeeper Jake Turner on loan until January 2022.

Colchester's first game of the season away at Carlisle ended in a 0–0 draw. Luke Chambers, Cameron Coxe, Alan Judge, and Cole Skuse all made their debuts for the club, while Frank Nouble and Freddie Sears both made their third debuts for the U's. Sylvester Jasper made his first appearance for the club off the bench.

On 10 August, Colchester travelled to face Birmingham City in the first round of the EFL Cup. The U's were beaten 1–0 thanks to a deflected goal from Marcel Oakley. Meanwhile, Academy graduate Gene Kennedy made his debut for the club, replacing Cole Skuse after 66-minutes.

On 12 August, young defender Billy Cracknell joined National League South side Concord Rangers on loan until January 2022.

In their first home match of the season with fans back in attendance, Colchester were beaten 1–0 by Northampton Town on 14 August. Jon Guthrie's first-half goal won the match for the visitors, but they did have their captain Fraser Horsfall sent off for deliberate handball in the 84th-minute. Luke Hannant also came off the bench to make his debut for the club.

Ahead of their home match against Mansfield Town on 17 August, Colchester United announced the signing of Charlie Daniels on a one-year deal. He had been on trial at the club.

In the match against Mansfield, Daniels made his debut from the substitutes' bench, the visitors struck first through former U's loanee Elliott Hewitt in the 72nd-minute. However, Freddie Sears scored Colchester's first goal of the season in the fifth minute of added time from the penalty spot after Frank Nouble had been fouled.

Freddie Sears converted his second consecutive penalty kick within the first ten minutes of Colchester's game against Oldham Athletic on 21 August. Brendan Sarpong-Wiredu had been fouled in the penalty area by Oldham's Davis Keillor-Dunn. Just three minutes later, the U's were 2–0 up through a Noah Chilvers goal. Oldham pulled a goal back in the 73rd-minute, but Colchester held on for their first win of the season.

On 21 August, Harvey Sayer joined National League South side Billericay Town in a three-month loan deal.

Colchester drew 1–1 with Rochdale on 27 August. The U's took the lead through a Max Taylor own goal in the first-half, but the hosts equalised through Jimmy Keohane after 61-minutes.

On 31 August, Colchester signed forward Armando Dobra on loan from Ipswich Town until the end of the season.

September
On 3 September, Colchester announced the signing of young midfielder Chay Cooper from Tottenham Hotspur. Cooper would join Dave Hussey's under-23 squad.

Colchester's home match against Sutton United in League Two scheduled for 4 September was postponed due to a number of positive COVID-19 cases at Sutton, in addition to injuries and international call-ups meaning they could not fulfil the fixture.

Harry Beadle, Armando Dobra, and Jake Turner all made their club debuts in Colchester's 1–0 home defeat by Gillingham in the EFL Trophy on 7 September. Robbie McKenzie's 93rd-minute goal proved the difference between the two sides.

The U's played out an exciting match at Barrow on 10 September. The home side took the lead in the 25th-minute through Jordan Stevens after capitalising on a poor backpass from Tommy Smith. Colchester were level ten minutes later when Alan Judge scored his first goal for the club, tapping in Freddie Sears' low cross. Sears then put his side 2–1 ahead just three minutes later. In the second half, Luke Chambers was sent off for the visitors for a second bookable offence, and then Luke Hannant conceded a penalty eight minutes later from which the hosts scored. Tom Eastman headed in his first goal of the season on 80-minutes to put the U's 3–2 ahead. Barrow then had James Jones sent off for a second booking in quick succession in the 90th-minute, as Colchester held out for victory.

Colchester were defeated 1–0 at home by Crawley Town on 18 September. Jack Payne's 22nd-minute goal separated the two teams.

On 24 September, under-23 side regulars Ted Collins and Sam Cornish joined Maldon & Tiptree on loan.

The U's travelled to Swindon Town on 25 September where they held the hosts to a 0–0 draw.

On 28 September, Colchester hosted West Ham United Under-21s in the EFL Trophy group stage. Armando Dobra's seventh-minute goal, his first for the club, was enough to secure victory for the U's. Chay Cooper also made his first-team debut in the match.

October
On 2 October, Colchester were beaten 2–0 at home by Salford City. Two goals within the first 25-minutes sealed victory for the visitors, before goalscorer Brandon Thomas-Asante was sent off for a second bookable offence in the 88th-minute.

A second successive defeat followed for Colchester on 8 October when they were beaten 2–0 at Tranmere Rovers.

The U's earned their first league home win of the season on 16 October, beating second placed Harrogate Town 1–0. Sylvester Jasper's first goal for the club in the 88th-minute secured all three points for Colchester.

Colchester secured a late draw at home to Bristol Rovers on 19 October with Noah Chilvers scoring an 88th-minute equaliser after Brett Pitman's second-half opener. Junior Tchamadeu received his first career red card alongside Rovers' Trevor Clarke for violent conduct in the first minute of stoppage time. This followed Cian Harries' dismissal four minutes earlier for a second bookable offence, meaning Rovers finished the match with nine players.

Harvey Sayer joined Southern League Premier Division Central side Needham Market on loan on 21 October following his loan spell at Billericay.

On 23 October, Port Vale beat Colchester 3–0 at Vale Park.

Jake Hutchinson joined National League South side Tonbridge Angels in a month-long loan deal on 26 October.

Colchester were beaten in successive matches following the 3–1 home defeat by Sutton United on 26 October. Freddie Sears had scored his fourth goal of the season in only the second minute of the game, but Sutton soon equalised through David Ajiboye. Sutton were then awarded a penalty after Samson Tovide, starting his first league match for the U's, was sent off for handball in the box. The visitors then took the lead from the spot, before victory was sealed in the 61st minute with a goal from Ben Goodliffe.

On 30 October, Colchester signed Shawn McCoulsky from Forest Green Rovers on a short-term contract having been released from the club in the summer.

Later the same day, the U's recorded a 2–1 victory against bottom club Scunthorpe United. Colchester took a fifth-minute lead through Freddie Sears, scoring his fifth goal of the season. Armando Dobra then doubled the U's advantage with 14 minutes played. Eight minutes from full-time, the visitors scored a consolation goal through Harry Davis.

November
Colchester opened the FA Cup first round with a local derby against eighth-tier AFC Sudbury on 5 November. The U's took the lead with a close range Brendan Sarpong-Wiredu effort after 35 minutes of play, and doubled their advantage four minutes later through Freddie Sears. Sylvester Jasper scored the goal of the game with a curling effort into the far corner on 71 minutes. Shawn McCoulsky came on to make his club debut and marked the occasion with a goal in the third minute of stoppage time.

The U's drew 0–0 with Ipswich Town on 9 November in their third and final EFL Trophy group match and lost 4–3 following a penalty shoot-out. This meant Colchester finished third in the group and were eliminated from the competition. However the following day it was revealed West Ham Under-21s had been deducted three points for fielding a suspended player. This meant that Colchester would progress to the knockout stages by finishing the group in second place a point behind Ipswich with four points while West Ham were eliminated with three points.

On 20 November, Colchester were beaten 1–0 away at Stevenage. Elliott List's first-half penalty proved the difference between the two sides.

Colchester hosted Exeter City on 23 November who were on a 15-game unbeaten run coming into the match. Sylvester Jasper scored after 12-minutes and Noah Chilvers doubled the U's lead just before half-time. Pádraig Amond's 69th-minute goal brought high-flying Exeter back into the match, but Freddie Sears sealed the win with his seventh goal of the season five minutes later.

On 26 November, defender Billy Cracknell signed for Isthmian League Premier Division side Bishop's Stortford in a month-long loan deal.

Newport County visited the Community Stadium on 26 November. The visitors took the lead through Dom Telford after 36-minutes but Freddie Sears' eighth goal of the campaign with 78-minutes played ensured a point for both teams.

On 30 November, Colchester played Swindon Town in the Southern Section Round 2 of the EFL Trophy away from home where the U's beat them 1–2. Both goals were scored by Luke Chambers in the 6th and 11th minute.

December 

On 5 December, Colchester faced Wigan Athletic in the second round of the FA Cup at home. Wigan opened the scoring in the 24th minute with a goal from Callum Lang. Freddie Sears’ goal from the edge of the box brought the U's back into the match in the 45+1 minute. Callum Lang scored his second of the game in the 74th minute of the game making the final score 1–2 to Wigan, knocking the U's out of the FA Cup.

On 8 December, Colchester faced Bradford City away from home in a goalless draw of 0-0

On 11 December, Colchester fell to a 3–0 defeat at Walsall with a brace from Otis Khan, and a goal from Jack Earling in the 66th minute to finish the U's off

January

On New Years Day, Colchester faced Crawley Town away from home, suffering a 3-1 loss with Freddie Sears scoring the only goal for the U’s

Players

Transfers and contracts

In

Out

Loans in

Loans out

Contracts
New contracts and contract extensions.

Match details

Pre-season friendlies
Colchester United announced they would play friendlies against Billericay Town, Watford, Tottenham Hotspur, Gillingham, Ipswich Town and Wealdstone as part of their pre-season preparations.

League Two

League table

Results summary

Results round by round

Matches
The 2021–22 League Two fixtures were announced on 24 June 2021.

FA Cup

Colchester were drawn away to AFC Sudbury in the first round and at home to Wigan Athletic in second round.

EFL Cup

Colchester were drawn away to Birmingham City in the first round of the EFL Cup.

EFL Trophy

Colchester United were drawn into Southern Group A alongside Gillingham, Ipswich Town and West Ham United U21s. The fixture dates for the group stage ties were announced on 7 July. In the knock-out stages, The U's were drawn away to Sutton United in the third round.

Squad statistics

Appearances and goals

|}

Goalscorers

Disciplinary record

Player debuts
Players making their first-team Colchester United debut in a fully competitive match.

See also
List of Colchester United F.C. seasons

References

2021-22
2021–22 EFL League Two by team